Pitman is an unincorporated community in Eldred Township, Schuylkill County, Pennsylvania, United States. The village center lies on state route 4022 and includes approximately twenty-five residences.  A US Post Office is in the village and because the 17964 postal code extends over nearly all of Eldred Township, area residents refer to the entire township as Pitman.  Agriculture is the primary industry.  Pitman is located in the far eastern end of the Mahantongo valley where Mahantango Mountain and Line Mountain meet. Little Mahantango Creek, a tributary within the Susquehanna River basin begins in the vicinity of Pitman and flows westward into Mahantango Creek.

The earliest settlements in the vicinity of Pitman were established in around 1800.  The village was originally known as Zimmermanstown.

Gallery

References

Unincorporated communities in Schuylkill County, Pennsylvania
Unincorporated communities in Pennsylvania